Koodli, also spelled Kudli or Kudali, is a small historic village in Shimoga District, in the Indian state of Karnataka. They meet here to give rise to the Tungabhadra River, a tributary of the Krishna river. Their valleys host many architectural sites. The village was a much larger town and pilgrimage center before the 14th-century, one destroyed during the Islamic conquests of the south. Important temples and their ruins here include the Sangamesvara temple (8th-century, oldest), Ramesvara temple, Sri Chintamani Narasimha temple, Sringeri Vediki temple (with monastery), Vishwakarma temple, Sharadamba temple (with monastery), Amma Devasthana, and the Brahmeswara temple. Other scattered ruins of unknown temples are also found here.

Location 

Koodli is 18 km from Shivamogga, a place where rivers Tunga and Bhadra flow together, hence the name Koodli. It has a Smarta Vedanta monastery stated to have been founded by Adi Shankara himself. Within the premises of the matha, there are shrines of Sharadamba and Shankaracharya. Outside, there are two temples of Hoysala times dedicated to Rameshwara and Narasimha. Koodali is also known as Varanasi of the south. It is home to Rushyashrama, Brahmeshwara, Narasimha and Rameshwara temples. The 600-year-old mutt of Shankaracharya still stands with inscriptions of Hoysala and Okkeri kings.

History 

 

The place has a historic value, with temples of near Hoysala time. There are shasanas carved near the temples that indicate the era when they were built. The exact dates are disputed, but the sculptures date back to age old Indian culture and look exotic. 
There are various temples - small and large ones built by the rulers who ruled this place in the age old era.

Religion 
The 12th century Rameshwara Temple is located in the area. There is also a Sri Chintamani Narasimha Swamy Temple beside the Sangameshwara temple. It is believed to be installed and worshipped by Sri Prahlada. The rivers are worshipped and considered to be sacred. A small temple with Nandi denotes the exact point where the two rivers meet, and is considered to be sacred.

There are two mutts (schools) in Koodli. One is Shankara mutt (Advaita Philosophy) & the other being Akshobhya Thirtha Mutt (Dvaita Philosophy).

Shankara Mutt 

There is very old Indian style school of learning for Shankara philosophy, called the Koodli mutt. This has a long history:
Once upon a time in the 15th or 16th century, the chief swamy of Shringeri had been on a teerthayaatre, probably to Kashi. He did not return for a long time, which caused the deputy chief to take up the chief's position. But the chief was alive and did return to Sringeri after a long time. But he of course could not go in to the mutt where his own pupil was the chief, so he left Kudali Sringeri. Now in the beginning of the 1900s, a new swami took the position of the chief swamy here. He was formerly the teacher of his highness Krishnaraja Wodeyar the 4th, Maharaja of Mysore. This brought good times to this mutt again. Between the original founder and this person, a few talented persons had been chiefs here which made this place keep up the standards. After independence, one particular person was very talented and influential and made the mutt a noted place again.

Koodli Arya Akshobhya Thirtha Mutt 
The Mutt was established by Sri Akshobhya Tirtha (a direct disciple of Sri Madhvacharya) around the 13th or 14th century. This matha was bifurcated when Akshobhya theertha fell ill and his disciple Sri Jayatirtha was on pilgrimage. Knowing that the time had come for him to enter vrindavana, he ordered one of his disciples to be the pontiff of the Uttaradi Math until Sri Jayatirtha returned. Akshobhya tirtha named him as Sri Trailokyabhushana tirtha, and went into the vrindavan. He had ordered Sri Trailokyabhushana theertha to return all the belongings and deity's of Sri Uttaradi Matha to Sri Jayatirtha once he came back from pilgrimage, in a ceremonious way, and ordered that Sri Jayatirtha would become the next pontiff of Sri Uttaradi Math. So when Sri Jayatirtha returned, Sri Trailokyabhusana handed him all the belongings and deity's of Sri Uttaradi Matha, in a ceremonious way. Seeing the respect of Sri Trailokyabhushana, Sri Jayatirtha handed him some idols and belongings of Sri Uttaradi Matha and advised him to create his own samsthana. So Sri Trailokyabhushana founded Sri Koodli Arya Akshobhya Tirtha Matha at Koodli. The mutt has a rich tradition and is famed for its knowledge of Sanskrit & Madhvacharya's philosophy. There have been three peetadhipathis till  date. The current peetadhipathi is H.H. Sri Raghuvijaya Thirta.
Satyadharma Tirtha 28th pontiff of Uttaradi Math Brindavan is in Holehonnur near koodli about 3km on the Shivamogga - Chitradurga road on the bank of the river Bhadra Bhadravathi taluk Shivamogga District.

Geography 
The place is situated about 16 km away from Shivamogga town and is accessible by road. The nearest village is Holehonnur which is around 3 km from here.

References

External links 

Cities and towns in Shimoga district